Nosara River is a river in the village of Nosara, Costa Rica.

References

Rivers of Costa Rica